Isabel is an unincorporated community in Washington Parish, Louisiana, United States. The community is located   NE of Covington, Louisiana.

References

Unincorporated communities in Washington Parish, Louisiana
Unincorporated communities in Louisiana